Attius Insteius Tertullus (flourished between 280 and 308) was a Roman urban prefect.

He was a descendant of Lucius Insteius Tertullus, who was sodalis Augustalis (i.e., priest of the deified Augustus) in 214. Having risen to become a senator, Tertullus served as consul suffect before his appointments as proconsul of Africa and praefectus urbi in 307–308. He was honoured by an inscription from Patavium, and was probably the father of Attius Insteius Tertullus Populonius, imperial governor of Apulia and Calabria.

Sources
A.H.M.Jones & J.R. Martindale, The Prosopography of the Later Roman Empire, Vol I (260-395 AD) (1971–1980) (Tertullus - 6).

3rd-century births
4th-century deaths
4th-century Romans
Roman governors of Africa
Urban prefects of Rome
Attii
Insteii